Chumbawamba were a British rock band formed in 1982 and disbanded in 2012. They are best known for their 1997 single "Tubthumping", which was nominated for Best British Single at the 1998 Brit Awards. Other singles include "Amnesia", "Enough Is Enough" (with MC Fusion), "Timebomb", "Top of the World (Olé, Olé, Olé)", and "Add Me". The band drew on genres such as punk rock, pop, and folk. Their anarcho-communist political leanings led them to have an irreverent attitude toward authority, and to espouse a variety of political and social causes including animal rights and pacifism (early in their career) and later regarding class struggle, Marxism, feminism, gay liberation, pop culture, and anti-fascism.

In July 2012, Chumbawamba announced they were splitting up after 30 years. The band was joined by former members and collaborators for three final shows between 31 October and 3 November 2012, one of which was filmed and released as a live DVD.

Band history

Early years
Chumbawamba formed in Burnley in 1982 with an initial line-up of Allan "Boff" Whalley, Danbert Nobacon (born Nigel Hunter), Midge and Tomi, all four previously members of the band Chimp Eats Banana, shortly afterwards joined by Lou Watts.  The band made their live debut in January 1982. Their first vinyl release was a track ("Three Years Later") on the Crass Records compilation album Bullshit Detector 2.  They were initially inspired musically by bands as diverse as the Fall, PiL, Wire, and Adam and the Ants and politically by the anarchist stance of Crass.  Another of the band's early releases was under the name "Skin Disease", parodying the Oi! bands of the time so successfully that they were included on Back On The Streets, an Oi! compilation EP put together by Sounds magazine journalist Garry Bushell.  By the end of 1982, the band had expanded to include Alice Nutter (of Ow My Hair's on Fire), and Dunstan "Dunst" Bruce (of Men in a Suitcase) and were living in a squat in Armley, Leeds on Carr Crofts road, with Harry "Daz" Hamer and Mavis "Mave" Dillon joining soon after.  Stalwarts of the cassette culture scene, the band released a number of tapes including Be Happy Despite It All and Raising Heck With Chumbawamba, and were featured on many compilations. Chumbawamba were at the forefront of the 1980s anarcho-punk movement, frequently playing benefit gigs in squats and small halls for causes such as animal rights, the anti-war movement, and community groups. The band's collective political views are often described as anarchist. They made several songs about the UK miners' strike, including the cassette Common Ground and a song dedicated to the pit village of Fitzwilliam, which was one of the worst cases of economic decline following the strike.

Sky and Trees and Agit-Prop Records
By the mid-1980s Chumbawamba had begun to release material using the vinyl format on their own Agit-Prop record label, which had evolved from an earlier project, Sky and Trees Records. The first release was the Revolution EP in 1985, which quickly sold out of its initial run, and was re-pressed, reaching No. 4 in the UK Indie Chart, and staying in the chart for 34 weeks. The first LP, Pictures of Starving Children Sell Records (1986), was a critique of the Live Aid concert organised by Bob Geldof, which the band argued was primarily a cosmetic spectacle designed to draw attention away from the real political causes of world hunger.

The band toured Europe with Dutch band the Ex, and a collaboration between members of the two bands, under the name "Antidote", led to the release of an EP, Destroy Fascism!, inspired by hardcore punk band Heresy, with whom they had also toured. Both the Ex and Chumbawamba were released on cassette tape in Poland during this period, when music censorship was entrenched in Iron Curtain nations. The "RED" label, based in Wrocław in south-west Poland during the late 1980s, only released cassette tapes and, despite the limits enforced by Polish authorities, was able to release Chumbawamba's music, in addition to bands from the USSR, East Germany and Czechoslovakia.

Chumbawamba's second album, Never Mind the Ballots...Here's the Rest of Your Lives, was released in 1987, coinciding with the general election, and questions the validity of the British democratic system of the time. The band adopted another moniker, Scab Aid, for the "Let It Be" song release that parodied a version of the Beatles song recorded by the popstar supergroup Ferry Aid to raise money for victims of the Zeebrugge ferry disaster.

The 1988 album English Rebel Songs 1381–1984, originally released as English Rebel Songs 1381–1914, was a recording of traditional songs.

One Little Indian Records
By the late 1980s and early 1990s, Chumbawamba had begun to absorb influences from techno music and rave culture. The band members quit their day jobs to begin concentrating on music full-time as they could now guarantee sales of 10,000 and they moved away from their original anarcho-punk roots, evolving a pop sensibility with releases such as Slap! (1990) and the sample-heavy Shhh (1992) (originally intended to be released as Jesus H Christ!, this album had to be withdrawn and re-recorded because of copyright problems). They also toured the United States for the first time in 1990.

When Jason Donovan took The Face magazine to court that same year for claiming he was lying by denying he was gay, Chumbawamba responded by printing up hundreds of 'Jason Donovan – Queer As Fuck' T-shirts and giving them away free with the single "Behave".

After signing to the independent One Little Indian record label, Anarchy (1994) lyrically remained as politically uncompromising as ever, continuing to address issues such as homophobia (see song "Homophobia",  the music video of which features the Sisters of Perpetual Indulgence), the Criminal Justice Act and the rise of fascism in the UK following the election of Derek Beackon, a British National Party councillor in south-east London in 1993.
The album was the band's biggest success to date, reaching the top 30 in the UK and the singles "Timebomb" and "Enough Is Enough" both entering the low end of the UK Singles Chart. The latter featured Credit to the Nation's rapper MC Fusion. The live shows to support the album were recorded and went to make up their first live album Showbusiness!, released in 1995.
One Little Indian also re-released Chumbawamba's back catalogue, which meant that the first three albums were released on CD for the first time. The first two, Pictures of Starving Children Sell Records (1985) and Never Mind the Ballots (1987), were repackaged as one disc under the title First 2.

Chumbawamba parted with One Little Indian during the recording of the 1996 album Swingin' with Raymond, although they did release one last CD entitled Portraits of Anarchists, which came with copies of Casey Orr's book of the same name.

EMI Records
Chumbawamba signed to EMI in Europe in 1997, a move that was viewed as controversial by many of their followers. They had been involved with a compilation LP called Fuck EMI in 1989, and had criticised the label in many of their earlier songs. The anarcho-punk band Oi Polloi (with whom Chumbawamba had previously toured and worked with on the 'Punk Aid' Smash the Poll Tax EP ) released an 'anti-Chumbawamba' EP, Bare Faced Hypocrisy Sells Records (Ruptured Ambitions 1998). Chumbawamba argued that EMI had severed the link with weapons manufacturer Thorn a few years previously, and that experience had taught them that, in a capitalist environment, almost every record company operates on capitalist principles: "Our previous record label One Little Indian didn't have the evil symbolic significance of EMI however they were completely motivated by profit." They added that this move brought with it the opportunity to make the band financially viable as well as to communicate their message to a wider audience.

Band politics and mainstream success
In 1997, Chumbawamba scored their biggest chart hit with "Tubthumping" (UK No. 2, US No. 6), which featured an audio sample of actor Pete Postlethwaite's performance in the film Brassed Off on the album version. This was followed up in early 1998 with "Amnesia", which reached No. 10 in the UK. During this period Chumbawamba gained some notoriety over several controversial incidents, starting in August 1997 when Nutter was quoted in the British music paper Melody Maker as saying, "Nothing can change the fact that we like it when cops get killed." The comment was met with outrage in Britain's tabloid press and was condemned by the Police Federation of England and Wales. The band resisted pressure from EMI to issue an apology and Nutter only clarified her comment by stating, "If you're working class they won't protect you. When you hear about them, it's in the context of them abusing people, y'know, miscarriages of justice. We don't have a party when cops die, you know we don't."

In January 1998 Nutter appeared on the American political talk show Politically Incorrect and advised fans of their music who could not afford to buy their CDs to steal them from large chains such as HMV and Virgin, which prompted Virgin to remove the album from the shelves and start selling it from behind the counter.

A few weeks later, provoked by the Labour government's refusal to support the Liverpool Dockworkers' Strike, the band performed "Tubthumping" at the 1998 BRIT Awards with the lyric changed to include "New Labour sold out the dockers, just like they'll sell out the rest of us", and vocalist Danbert Nobacon later poured a jug of water over UK Deputy Prime Minister John Prescott, who was in the audience.

In the late 1990s, the band turned down $1.5 million from Nike to use the song "Tubthumping" in a World Cup advertisement. According to the band, the decision took approximately "30 seconds" to make.

In the EA Sports soccer game World Cup 98, the song "Tubthumping" is one of the soundtrack titles.

In 2002, General Motors paid Chumbawamba a sum of either $70,000 or $100,000, to use the song "Pass It Along" from the WYSIWYG album, for a Pontiac Vibe television advertisement in 2002. Chumbawamba gave the money to the anti-corporate activist groups Indymedia and CorpWatch who used the money to launch an information and environmental campaign against GM.

EMI released the band's first collection album which featured a mixed bag of songs from between 1985 and 1998 under the title Uneasy Listening.

Also in 1998 came a Japan-only mini album, Amnesia, consisting of country and western style versions of recent hits "Tubthumping" and "Amnesia" alongside earlier songs like "Mouthful of Shit".

As a millennium present, Chumbawamba sent out a limited edition single to everyone on their mailing list. The song was a shoop-shoop-style ballad, "Tony Blair", which read like a heartbroken letter to an ex-lover who had broken all his promises. The band would send another free single out two years later, this time a re-worked version of the Beatles' song "Her Majesty" to coincide with the Queen's Golden Jubilee, with lyrics denouncing royalty.

Chumbawamba released the album WYSIWYG in 2000, which included a cover of the early Bee Gees song "New York Mining Disaster". The single "She's Got All The Friends That Money Can Buy" was backed by "Passenger List For Doomed Flight 1721", a song that listed all of the people that the band would like to see "disappear". The list of unfortunates included Tony Blair, Ally McBeal and Bono. Chumbawamba parted from EMI in 2001. The band later said that they got what they wanted from the deal with EMI: "we released some great records, we travelled all over the world, appeared on all these TV programmes, and we made loads of money, a lot of which we gave away or ploughed into worthwhile causes".

To celebrate their 20 years together, the band made a documentary film based on footage that they had recorded over the past two decades. Originally intended to be simply a compilation of their videos, the result was entitled Well Done, Now Sod off. The title was taken from an early review of a Chumbawamba record and the film included both lovers and haters of the band.

Mutt Records 

Chumbawamba formed Mutt Records, their own record label, in 2002. It released their albums Readymades (2002), Revenger's Tragedy (2003 soundtrack), and Un (2004).

No Masters Records

No Masters Records released Chumbawamba's A Singsong and a Scrap in 2005.

In 2007, Chumbawamba played at the Glastonbury Festival. In early 2007, the band announced via their website that a new album was in the works, stating that "the new album will be acoustic and probably won't sound like A Singsong and a Scrap".

The result was The Boy Bands Have Won, released on 3 March 2008 in the UK and 14 March in mainland Europe. The record contained 25 tracks, some of them full-length songs, some of them no more than a minute long and was again acoustic folk in style. The album features the Oysterband, Roy Bailey and Barry Coope amongst others.

In late 2009 Chumbawamba toured northern England in their self-penned pantomime, a comedy musical entitled Riot, Rebellion & Bloody Insurrection with the Red Ladder Theatre Company. In late February 2010 they released their 15th album, titled ABCDEFG.

In September 2011, past and present band members protested when the UK Independence Party used "Tubthumping" at their annual conference.

Charity work
Chumbawamba is a member of the Canadian charity Artists Against Racism and participated in a Radio PSA for them.

In 1998, Chumbawamba contributed to the album released by the Polish "Never Again" Association as a part of its Music Against Racism campaign. In 2021 the album was reissued as vinyl record One Race – Human Race. Music Against Racism: Part 2.

Break-up
On 8 July 2012, Chumbawamba announced that they would be disbanding at the end of the year. On their website they opened the statement with "That's it then, it’s the end. With neither a whimper, a bang or a reunion." They stated they would continue with individual efforts, and ended their official statement:
We do, of course, reserve the right to re-emerge as Chumbawamba doing something else entirely (certainly not touring and putting out albums every 2 or 3 years). But frankly, that's not very likely. Thirty years of being snotty, eclectic, funny, contrary and just plain weird. What a privilege, and what a good time we’ve had.

In December 2012, the final UK show, filmed at the Leeds City Varieties on Halloween night, was released as Chumbawamba's only live DVD, entitled Going Going.

A mail-order EP, In Memoriam: Margaret Thatcher, was released on 8 April 2013. The CD had been recorded in 2005 and made available for pre-order on the group's website, to be issued upon the death of Margaret Thatcher.

After leaving Chumbawamba, vocalist Dunstan Bruce founded Dandy Films, an independent film and video company whose projects have included a "video blog" of the Levellers' UK tour during 2010 and Sham 69's tour of China.

In 2012 former Chumbawamba members Dunstan Bruce and Harry Hamer formed a new band, Interrobang?!, with guitarist Stephen Griffin of London-based Regular Fries.

In August 2017, Dunstan Bruce, Boff Whalley and Jude Abbott were interviewed on BBC's The One Show from the Leeds City Varieties and near their former home celebrating 20 years since the release of "Tubthumping".

Documentary
On 1 July 2015 Dunstan Bruce started a Kickstarter to fund a documentary titled I Get Knocked Down (The Untold Story of Chumbawamba) that told the band's entire history from different members' perspective. He surpassed his £40,000 goal. That same year, Chumbawamba was the featured subject on two podcasts produced by Gimlet Media: StartUp #16 "The Secret Formula" and Surprisingly Awesome #4 "Tubthumping".

Theatre

Former member Alice Nutter has had a number of plays performed at the Leeds Playhouse, where she took a writing course in 2006. In addition, a neon sculpture on the side of the theatre features the lyric "I get knocked down but I get up again" from the band's single "Tubthumping".

Musical style
Chumbawamba has been described as various genres including, anarcho-punk, pop, folk, world, dance, alternative rock pop rock, electronic, rock, and a cappella.

Members

The band's membership varied over the years, with the line-up and musical assignments in the early years being especially fluid (members were known to switch instruments between, or even during, gigs). This is a list of principal official members and collaborators, drawn mainly from the credits of their releases since 1985. Short-term members and collaborators are not included.

Former members

Boff Whalley – vocals, lead guitar, clarinet (1982–2012)
Danbert Nobacon – vocals, rhythm guitar, banjo, ukulele, keyboards (1982–2004, 2012)
Lou Watts – vocals, rhythm guitar, keyboards (1982–2012)
Dunstan Bruce – vocals, percussion, guitar, turntables, saxophone (1982–2004, 2012)
Alice Nutter – vocals, percussion (1982–2004, 2012)
Harry "Daz" Hamer – drums, percussion, guitar, programming, vocals (1982–2004, 2012)
Mavis "Mave" Dillon – trumpet, French horn, bass, vocals (1984–1995)
Paul Greco – bass, harmonica  (1992–1999, 2012)
Jude Abbott – vocals, recorder, flute, trumpet, flugelhorn (1996–2012)
Neil Ferguson – vocals, guitar, bass, keyboards (1999–2012)
Phil Moody – accordion, vocals (2007–2012)

Frequent guests
Neil Ferguson – producer, engineer, guitar, bass, keyboards (promoted to full band member in 1999)
Simon "Commonknowledge" Lanzon – vocals, keyboards, piano, accordion
MC Fusion – vocals on Shhh and Anarchy
Cobie Laan – vocals, live recording
Stephen Blood – maracas, French horn
Jimmy Echo (actually a band member's father impersonating Elvis) – vocals on some versions of "Timebomb" and "Amnesia"
B. J. Cole – slide guitar on WYSIWYG
Folk vocal trio Coope, Boyes & Simpson on A Singsong and a Scrap, Get On With It! and The Boy Bands Have Won
The Charlie Cake Marching Band on The Boy Bands Have Won and ABCDEFG
Members of Oysterband on "Goodbye to the Crown", A Singsong and a Scrap, The Boy Bands Have Won and ABCDEFG
Roy Bailey and Robb Johnson – guest lead vocals on The Boy Bands Have Won
 Jo Freya – saxes on The Boy Bands Have Won and ABCDEFG
 Belinda O'Hooley – piano on ABCDEFG
 Michelle Plum – vocals on "Sewing Up Crap" on Readymades and live vocals/keyboards from 2001–2004
 Winkie Thin - accordion on A Singsong and a Scrap

Timeline

Discography

Pictures of Starving Children Sell Records (1986)
Never Mind the Ballots (1987)
English Rebel Songs 1381-1914 (1988)
Slap! (1990)
Shhh (1992)
Anarchy (1994)
Swingin' with Raymond (1995)
Tubthumper (1997)
WYSIWYG (2000)
Readymades (2002)
Revengers Tragedy Soundtrack (2003)English Rebel Songs 1381-1984 (2003)Un (2004)A Singsong and a Scrap (2005)The Boy Bands Have Won (2008)ABCDEFG (2010)

Awards and nominations
{| class=wikitable
|-
! Year !! Awards !! Work !! Category  !! Result
|-
| rowspan=2|1997
| Denmark GAFFA Awards
| Chumbawamba
| Foreign New Act
| 
|-
| Žebřík Music Awards
| "Tubthumping"
| Best International Song
| 
|-
| rowspan=4|1998
|Tokio Hot 100 Awards
| Chumbawamba
| Best Character
| 
|-
| Hungarian Music Awards
| Tubthumper| Album of the Year 
| 
|-
| MTV Video Music Awards
| rowspan=4|"Tubthumping"
| Best New Artist
| 
|-
| Brit Awards
| Best British Single
| 
|-
| rowspan=2|1999
| rowspan=2|BMI Pop Awards
| College Song of the Year 
| 
|-
| Award-Winning Song
| 

See also
Anarchism and the arts
Bill Smith (fell runner) for "Stud Marks on the Summit" by Chumbawamba
Punk ideology
Animal rights and punk subculture

References

Further reading
Boff Whalley, Footnote*'', Pomona Books, 2003,   (Boff's autobiographical account of the band's history)

External links

Cassette culture 1970s–1990s
1982 establishments in the United Kingdom
2012 disestablishments in the United Kingdom
Anarcho-punk groups
Culture jamming
EMI Records artists
Musical groups established in 1982
Musical groups disestablished in 2012
One Little Independent Records artists
20th-century squatters
Video game musicians
Punk rock groups from West Yorkshire
Alternative rock groups from Leeds
Westpark Music artists